Ballet flats are women's shoes for everyday wear which are similar to/inspired by a women's ballet shoes, with a very thin heel or the appearance of no heel at all. The style sometimes features a ribbon-like binding around the low tops of the slipper and may have a slight gathering at the top-front of the vamp (toe box) and sometimes a tiny, decorative string tie. Ballet slippers can be adjusted and tightened to the wearer's foot by means of this string tie.

Ballet flats are especially popular for women and girls of all ages, being worn as a fashion trend and as a more comfortable alternative to high heels with everything from casual wear to formal wear and everything in between from jeans, shorts, skirts, dresses and leggings. Not all but a number of schools allow ballet flats as part of the uniform requirements and many school bands require ballet flats in black as part of the dress requirements for performances.

History
The essence of the ballet flat has existed since at least the 16th century, when men wore a similar shoe, then known as pompes. In medieval times ballet flats were popular with both men and women. They only went out of fashion in the 17th and 18th centuries when the high-heeled shoe came into fashion after Catherine de' Medici requested that her cobbler add 5 cm (2 inches) to her wedding shoes. Heels went out of fashion quickly after Marie Antoinette walked to the guillotine in a pair of heels. Functional shoes – sandals, boots, and flat shoes – prevailed in the 19th century. 

American designer Claire McCardell commissioned Salvatore Capezio to make ballet flats with rubber soles, in fabrics matching her designs, which was an instant hit, creating the modern ballet flats. They were displayed at an exhibition of twenty years of McCardell's garments at the Frank Perls Gallery in Beverly Hills in April 1953.

In 1947, Rose Repetto hand stitched her first ballet flat for her son, famous dancer and choreographer, Roland Petit. Once actress Brigitte Bardot donned a pair of Repetto's flats, variations of ballet flats became wildly popular and returned as a fashion trend. They are also often referred to as ballet pumps or ballet sneakers and designed for outdoor wear, using a variety of fabrics and usually with a rubber sole. In 1957, Audrey Hepburn wore ballet flats with cigarette pants in Funny Face, which also raised a wave of popularity.

References

Citations

Bibliography
 N. Rexford. Women's Shoes in America, 1875–1930. Kent, OH: Kent State University, 2000. pp. 65
 P. McGinnis. Biomechanics of Sports and Exercise, 2nd ed. Champaign, IL: Human Kinetics, 2005. pp. 139.
 Thompson and R.T. Floyd. Manual of Structural Kinesiology. New York: McGraw-Hill, 2004. pp. 232.

Further reading
W. Rossi: Why Shoes Make 'Normal' Gait Impossible Podiatry Magagement, March 1999: pp 50–61. Unshod.org. 25, Oct. 2006.

Footwear